The 1938–39 Luxembourg National Division was the 29th season of top level association football in Luxembourg.

Overview
It was contested by 10 teams, and Stade Dudelange won the championship.

League standings

Results

References
Luxembourg - List of final tables (RSSSF)

Luxembourg National Division seasons
Lux 
Nat